The list of ship launches in 1765 includes a chronological list of some ships launched in 1765.


References

1765
Ship launches